Immigration to Spain increased significantly in the beginning of the 21st century. In 1998, immigrants accounted for 1.6% of the population, and by 2009, that number had jumped to above 12% — one of the highest in Europe at the time.  Until 2014, the numbers were decreasing due to the economic crisis, but since then, immigration to Spain has increased again since 2015.

As of 2020, there were 7,231,195 foreign-born people in Spain, making up to 15.23% of the Spanish population including 5,015,263 (10.57%) born in a non-European country. Of these, 5,434,153 (11.45%) didn't have Spanish citizenship. This makes Spain one of the world's preferred destinations to immigrate to, being the 
4th country in Europe by immigration numbers and the 10th worldwide. Spain attracts significant immigration from Latin America and Eastern Europe. The fastest-growing immigrant groups in 2017 were Venezuelans, Colombians, Italians, Ukrainians, and Argentinians.

The population of Spain doubled during the 20th century due to the spectacular demographic boom in the 1960s and early 1970s. The birth rate then plunged by the 1980s, and Spain's population became stagnant, its demographics showing one of the lowest sub-replacement fertility rate in the world..

During the early 21st century, the average year-on-year demographic growth set a new record with its 2003 peak variation of 2.1%, doubling the previous record reached back in the 1960s when a mean year on year growth of 1% was experienced. This trend is far from being reversed at the present moment and, in 2005 alone, the immigrant population of Spain increased by 700,000 people.

Spain accepted 478,990 new immigrant residents in the first six months of 2022 alone. During these first six months, 220,443 people also emigrated from Spain, leaving a record-breaking net migration figure of 258,547. The data shows that more women than men chose to move to Spain during 2022, this is due to higher rates of emigration from Latin America.

Currently

According to the United Nations, there were 5,947,106 immigrants in Spain in early 2018, 12.8% of population of Spain. According to the Spanish government, there were 5.6 million foreign residents in Spain in 2010; independent estimates put the figure 14% of total population (Red Cross, World Disasters Report 2006). According to the official 2011 census data, almost 800,000 were Romanian, 774,000 were Moroccan, 317,000 were Ecuadorian, 312,000 were British and 250,000 were Colombian . Other important foreign communities are Bolivian (4.1%), German (3.4%), Italian (3.1%), Bulgarian (2.9%), Chinese (2.6%) and Argentine (2.5%). In 2005, a regularization programme increased the legal immigrant population by 700,000 people. Since 2000, Spain has experienced high population growth as a result of immigration flows, despite a birth rate that is only half of the replacement level.

According to Eurostat, in 2010, there were 6.4 million foreign-born residents in Spain, corresponding to 14.0% of the total population. Of these, 4.1 million (8.9%) were born outside the EU and 2.3 million (5.1%) were born in another EU Member State.

As of 2005 Spain had the second highest immigration rates within the EU, just after Cyprus, and the second highest absolute net migration in the World (after the USA). This can be explained by a number of reasons including its strong economic growth at the time, the large size of its underground economy and the strength of the agricultural and construction sectors which demand more low cost labour than can be offered by the national workforce, as well as business opportunities for immigrants coming from other developed countries. In fact, booming Spain was Europe's largest absorber of migrants from 2002 to 2007, with its immigrant population more than doubling as 2.5 million people arrived.

Over 920,000 immigrants arrived in Spain during 2007, on top of the 802,971 new arrivals in 2006, 682,711 new arrivals in 2005, and 645,844 new arrivals in 2004.

Although the number of immigrants in Spain, officially, is smaller than that of other countries in the EU, the following data should be taken into consideration:

 Immigrants from countries belonging to the former Spanish Empire (mainly in Central and South America–Latin America–, Asia–the Philippines– and Africa–Equatorial Guinea and Western Sahara–) can obtain Spanish nationality after legal and continuous residence of 2 years in Spain, after which naturalized citizens are no longer counted as immigrants.
 In order to avoid statelessness, Spain automatically grants Spanish nationality to the children of immigrants born in Spain whose parents' nationality of origin is not transferred jus sanguinis upon their child's birth abroad. This is unlike many other countries in the EU. It is for this reason that although the Latin American immigrants of origin are most numerous, the Romanians or the Moroccans surpassed them in the official statistics.

In the same way the majority of children born in Spain between 2000 and 2010 are children of immigrants despite not counting as such. Considering these data, there are sectors of Spanish society who oppose immigration that affirm the real number of immigrants in Spain is 10–11 million, or about 25% of the total population.

As for nationalities outside of this category, in order to stay in Spain for more than 3 months, a residence card, residence visa or work permit is required.

In all, two distinct groups can be identified: those immigrants (mostly in working age) originating from countries mostly located in Eastern Europe, South America or Africa, with lower GDP per capita than Spain, comprising most of the immigrating population, and those (whom many are retired) immigrants originating from northern European or another western countries with a higher GDP per capita than Spain.

Immigrants from Europe
Immigrants from the Europe make up a growing proportion of immigrants in Spain. The main countries of origin are Romania, the United Kingdom, Germany, Italy, and Bulgaria.

The British authorities estimate that the real population of British citizens living in Spain is much bigger than Spanish official figures suggest, establishing them at about 1,000,000, about 800,000 being permanent residents.
Of these, according to the BBC and contrary to popular belief, only about 21.5% are over the age of 65.

In fact, according to the Financial Times, Spain is the most favoured destination for West Europeans considering to move from their own country and seek jobs elsewhere in the EU.

Social attitudes to immigration

Unlike other countries in the EU, Spain has not recorded any relevant anti-immigration bout until fairly recently. According to some analysts, the causes behind this are multiple. Drawing from the experience of many Spaniards during the 1960s and then again in the beginning of the 21st century when the crisis struck the country, there may be also a collective understanding that hardships force people to seek work abroad.

A January 2004 survey by Spanish newspaper El País showed that the "majority" of Spaniards believe immigration was too high. Small parties, such as Movimiento Social Español, openly campaign using nationalist or anti-immigrant rhetoric as do other small far-right parties such as National Democracy (Spain) and España 2000. These parties have never won national or regional parliamentary seats. However, since its foundation in recent years, the far-right politial party Vox has managed to disrupt mainstream politics, favouring tough stance against immigration and especially demonising migrant children.

Immigration by country of origin
Population by country of birth as of 2021:

Recent trends

Major immigration 
This chart shows the numbers and difference of foreign nationals in Spain after 2000. European Union member states are indicated with the EU flag in regional European sub-divisions. The number of Latin American immigrants decreased massively after 2009 mostly due to the naturalization of hundreds of thousands of these citizens who achieved the Spanish citizenship and therefore do not count as immigrants anymore on the official statistics. See the chart from below from the "Naturalizations" paragraph for further information.

From other countries

Europe 
European Union member states are indicated with the EU flag in regional European sub-divisions.

Africa 

 Source:

Central America

North America

Asia

Oceania

Comparison with other countries from European Union
According to Eurostat 47.3 million people lived in the European Union in 2010 who were born outside their resident country. This corresponds to 9.4% of the total EU population. Of these, 31.4 million (6.3%) were born outside the EU and 16.0 million (3.2%) were born in another EU member state. The largest absolute numbers of people born outside the EU were in Germany (6.4 million), France (5.1 million), the United Kingdom (4.7 million), Spain (4.1 million), Italy (3.2 million), and the Netherlands (1.4 million).

Irregular migration 

Even though the main paths for the entry of clandestine migration have traditionally been airports and land borders, the sea route has proven to have a "profound impact at the social level" owing to qualitative, rather than quantitative, reasons.

Regarding the governance of the migration of Sub-Saharan people from Morocco (and Western Sahara) into Spain (which include crossings into the autonomous cities of Ceuta and Melilla, as well as a sea route to the Canary Islands), the Moroccan and Spanish authorities follow necropolitical forms of border control which are complemented with the favouring of the idea of "advancing borders" by reaching deals with origin or transit countries such as Guinea Conakry, Mali, Ivory Coast, and Gambia.

Naturalizations 
Since the end of the 20th century the number of foreigners who have obtained Spanish nationality has grown steadily, as Spain has been the EU country with the biggest number of approved naturalizations since 2010 until 2015. 1 out of 4 naturalizations made in the European Union in 2014 were belonging to Spain. Most of these naturalizations went to citizens coming from Latin America (which explains the massive decrease of these citizens counting as immigrants in Spain) mainly from Colombia, Ecuador and Perú, although Morocco was amongst the top 3 as well. After 4 years being the first, Spain dropped to the 3rd position in 2015 due to the stricter laws to naturalize citizens. Still, 114.351 foreigners became Spanish citizens in 2015, the majority being Latin Americans.

See also

 Immigration to Europe
Spanish nationality law
 List of countries by immigrant population
 List of sovereign states and dependent territories by fertility rate

References

External links
 ASESER Teranga: Asociación de Inmigrantes Senegaleses Residentes en A Coruña 

 
Demographics of Spain
Ethnic groups in Spain